N93 (DXTM 93.3 MHz) is an FM station owned and operated by M.I.T. Radio Television Network. Its studios and transmitter are located at Brgy. Sta. Cruz, Jimenez, Misamis Occidental.

References

External links
N93 FB Page

Radio stations in Misamis Occidental
Radio stations established in 2010